The 2022 Winter Olympics, officially known as the XXIV Olympic Winter Games, was a winter multi-sport event held in Beijing, China from 4 to 20 February. A total of 2,871 athletes from 91 nations participated in 109 events in seven sports across 15 disciplines.

Overall 29 nations received at least one medal, and 23 of them won at least one gold medal. Athletes from Norway won the most medals overall, with 37, and the most gold medals, with 16. The latter record was the highest gold medal tally at a single Winter Games. Host nation China won nine gold medals surpassing its gold medal tally of five during 2010 winter edition. Athletes from that nation also won 15 medals overall, which eclipsed its record of 11 at both the 2006 and 2010 winter editions.

Biathletes Johannes Thingnes Bø, Quentin Fillon Maillet, and Marte Olsbu Røiseland, and cross-country skier Alexander Bolshunov won the most total medals at the games with five each. Bø also earned the most gold medals with four. Snowboarder Zoi Sadowski-Synnott of New Zealand won the first Winter Olympic gold medal for that nation. Germany achieved a podium sweep in the men's two-man bobsleigh competition with Francesco Friedrich and Thorsten Margis	winning gold, Johannes Lochner and Florian Bauer earning silver, and Christoph Hafer and Matthias Sommer attaining bronze.

Medal table

The medal table is based on information provided by the International Olympic Committee (IOC) and is consistent with IOC convention in its published medal tables. By default, the table is ordered by the number of gold medals the athletes from a nation have won, where nation is an entity represented by a National Olympic Committee (NOC). The number of silver medals is taken into consideration next and then the number of bronze medals.

Two bronze medals were awarded Daniela Maier and Fanny Smith for a third-place tie freestyle women's ski cross event following a decision by the Court of Arbitration for Sport (CAS).

See also
 2022 Winter Paralympics medal table
 List of 2022 Winter Olympics medal winners

References

2022 Winter Olympics
China sport-related lists
Winter Olympics medal tables